Cheb–Hranice v Čechách railway is the number 148 railway of the Czech Republic, which is partially electrified at . It is operated by Czech Railways and mainly Czech-made ČD Class 814 and ČD Class 810 locomotives are on the line.

History

Between Cheb and Aš 
The section between Cheb and Aš was built in 1865 by Bavarian Railways. Railway station of Cheb was opened in the same year, but was destroyed by heavy bombing at the end of World War II. An interim one was built, which was replaced by the current one in 1962.

Between Aš and Hranice v Čechách
The section from Asch (Aš) to Roßbach (Hranice v Čechách) was built from 1884 to 1885. It was opened on 26 September 1885 and contributed to the improvement of Hranice's textile manufacturing. The station at Asch belonged to the Bavarian Railways, so locally it was called the Bavarian railway station. The town's second station was built by the Imperial Royal Privileged Austrian State Railway Company. Until 2002 there was also a third, suburban railway station in Aš, which today is only a single-platform halt with a metal shelter. The Bavarian station was demolished in 1968 and replaced by a new one in 1969. It is the main railway station of the town. Aš-město (the town's second station) was renovated in 2008.

Route
The railway starts from the main railway station at Cheb and runs through Františkovy Lázně Aquaforum, Františkovy Lázně, Vojtanov and Hazlov before arriving at Aš, where there are Aš – hlavní nádraží (Aš railway station), and Aš-město (Aš town) stations.

In the 1980s all trains from Cheb went as far as Hranice v Čechách; during the following decade there were fewer connections between Aš-město and Hranice v Čechách. In 2008 there was only one pair of trains on this part of the line.

Stations and stops on the line

Further reading
 Wilfried Rettig: Die Eisenbahnen im Vogtland. Band 2. Neben- und Schmalspurstrecken, Bahnanlagen, Unfälle, Anekdoten. EK-Verlag, Freiburg 2002, .

External links
 Fahrplan 1944/45: Strecke 422e 
 Cheb–Hranice v Čechách auf www.zelpage.cz 
 "Mockel" - Die Roßbacher Bahn, private Internetseite von Thomas Schindel 

Railway lines in the Czech Republic
Railway lines opened in 1865